The Quinnipiac Bobcats are the 21 sports teams representing Quinnipiac University in Hamden, Connecticut in intercollegiate athletics. The Bobcats compete in the NCAA Division I and are members of the Metro Atlantic Athletic Conference, joining on July 1, 2013, after being in the Northeast Conference.

The Bobcats compete outside the MAAC in three sports. Despite the MAAC sponsoring field hockey, the Bobcats moved their field hockey team into the Big East Conference in 2016. In ice hockey, a sport not sponsored by the MAAC for either men or women, both Quinnipiac teams play in ECAC Hockey. In the Spring of 2017, Quinnipiac announced they were partnering with Adidas to provide athletic wear for all varsity teams.

Teams

References

External links

 

 
Sports teams in the New York metropolitan area
Rugby union teams in Connecticut